The statutory boards of the Government of Singapore are autonomous organisations that have been tasked to perform an operational function by legal statutes passed as Acts in the Parliament of Singapore. The statutes define the purpose, rights and powers of each authority. These organisations would usually subsequently report to one specific ministry. This list includes both current and new statutory boards formed.

Singapore is a country known for its highly efficient and centralised government system largely due to these statutory boards. They play a significant role in the development and implementation of policies and programs in various sectors of the country. 

These boards are responsible for providing essential services and regulating key industries, with the goal of ensuring the welfare and well-being of Singaporeans. The highly centralized and efficient system of statutory boards has contributed to Singapore's success as a modern and prosperous nation.

Current statutory boards
Accounting and Corporate Regulatory Authority (ACRA)
Agency for Science, Technology and Research (A*STAR)
Board of Architects (BOA)
Building and Construction Authority (BCA)
Central Provident Fund Board (CPF)
Civil Aviation Authority of Singapore (CAAS)
Civil Service College (CSC)
Competition and Consumer Commission of Singapore (CCCS)
Council for Estate Agencies (CEA)
Defence Science and Technology Agency (DSTA)
Economic Development Board (EDB)
Energy Market Authority (EMA)
Enterprise Singapore (ESG)
Gambling Regulatory Authority of Singapore (GRA)
Government Technology Agency of Singapore (GovTech)
Health Promotion Board (HPB)
Health Sciences Authority (HSA)
Home Team Science and Technology Agency (HTX)
Hotels Licensing Board (HLB)
Housing and Development Board (HDB)
Infocomm Media Development Authority (IMDA)
Inland Revenue Authority of Singapore (IRAS)
Institute of Technical Education (ITE)
Intellectual Property Office of Singapore (IPOS)
ISEAS–Yusof Ishak Institute (ISEAS)
JTC Corporation (JTC)
Land Surveyors Board (LSB)
Land Transport Authority (LTA)
Majlis Ugama Islam Singapura (MUIS)
Maritime and Port Authority of Singapore (MPA)
Monetary Authority of Singapore (MAS)
Nanyang Polytechnic (NYP)
National Arts Council (NAC)
National Council of Social Service (NCSS)
National Environment Agency (NEA)
National Heritage Board (NHB)
National Library Board (NLB)
National Parks Board (NParks)
Ngee Ann Polytechnic (NP)
People's Association (PA)
Professional Engineers Board, Singapore (PEB)
Public Utilities Board (PUB)
Public Transport Council (PTC)
Republic Polytechnic (RP)
Science Centre Board (SCB)
Sentosa Development Corporation (SDC)
Singapore Accountancy Commission (SAC) - To be merged into ACRA by H2 2022 
Singapore Dental Council (SDC)
Singapore Examinations and Assessment Board (SEAB)
Singapore Food Agency (SFA)
Singapore Labour Foundation (SLF)
Singapore Land Authority (SLA)
Singapore Medical Council (SMC)
Singapore Nursing Board (SNB)
Singapore Pharmacy Council (SPC)
Singapore Polytechnic (SP)
Singapore Tourism Board (STB)
SkillsFuture Singapore (SSG)
Sport Singapore (SPORTSG)
TCM Practitioners Board (TCMPB)
Temasek Polytechnic (TP)
Tote Board (TOTE BOARD)
Urban Redevelopment Authority (URA)
Workforce Singapore (WSG)
Yellow Ribbon Singapore (YRSG)

Former statutory boards
Casino Regulatory Authority of Singapore (CRA), reconstituted to become a gambling regulator (GRA) on 1 August 2022 
Commercial and Industrial Security Corporation (CISCO), corporatised as CISCO Security on 5 July 2005 
Nanyang Technological University (NTU), corporatised on 1 April 2006
National University of Singapore (NUS), corporatised on 1 April 2006
Post Office Savings Bank (POSB), acquired by DBS Bank on 16 November 1998.
Singapore Broadcasting Authority (SBA), formed on 1 October 1994, merged into Media Development Authority on 1 January 2003.
Singapore Broadcasting Corporation (SBC) corporatised as the Television Corporation of Singapore on 1 October 1994
Singapore Harbour Board, taken over by the Port of Singapore Authority on 1 April 1964
SingTel corporatised on 1 April 1992
SingPost corporatised on 1 April 1992
National Computer Board, reorganised into Infocomm Development Authority of Singapore on 1 December 1999. 
Telecommunication Authority of Singapore, reorganised into Infocomm Development Authority of Singapore on 1 December 1999. 
Public Works Department, corporatised as the CPG Corporation in 1999
Media Development Authority (MDA) and Infocomm Development Authority of Singapore (IDA), reorganised into Infocomm Media Development Authority (IMDA) in 2016
Singapore Totalisator Board, rebranded as Tote Board (TOTE BOARD) in 2008
Preservation of Monuments Board (PMB), merged as Preservation of Sites and Monuments under National Heritage Board (NHB) on 1 July 2009
Singapore Sports Council (SSC), rebranded as Sport Singapore (SPORTSG) on 1 April 2014
Singapore Workforce Development Agency (WDA), reconstituted as Workforce Singapore (WSG) on 4 October 2016
Council for Private Education (CPE), functions absorbed under a new statboard SkillsFuture Singapore (SSG) on 4 October 2016
SPRING Singapore (SPRING), formed in 2002 to support enterprises, reorganised into Enterprise Singapore (ESG) on 1 April 2018
Trade Development Board, formed in 1983 and renamed to International Enterprise Singapore (IE Singapore) in 2002 to support internationalisation, reorganised into Enterprise Singapore (ESG) on 1 April 2018
Competition Commission of Singapore (CCS), formed on 1 January 2005 to enforce competition law. Renamed to Competition and Consumer Commission of Singapore (CCCS) on 1 April 2018 to reflect its new role in protecting consumer rights
Agri-Food and Veterinary Authority of Singapore (AVA), formed on 1 April 2000 to regulate food and veterinary issues. Dissolved into Singapore Food Agency (SFA) for food issues and National Parks Board (NParks) for veterinary issues on 1 April 2019

Statutory or privatised government corporations
Civil Aviation Authority of Singapore, reconstituted with regulatory functions on 1 July 2009
Changi Airport Group, corporatisation of airport operations on 1 July 2009
Housing and Development Board
Building & Development Division, corportised into HDB Corporation on 1 July 2003, renamed to Surbana Corporation and now CapitaLand Township. 
Jurong Town Corporation, corporatised and reconstituted as JTC Corporation on 15 November 2000
Ascendas Private Limited, corporatisation and merger of property group on 8 January 2001
Jurong Consultants Private Limited, corporatisation of technical services group on 9 April 2001
Jurong Port Private Limited, corporatisation of port services group on 12 January 2001
Port of Singapore Authority (PSA)'s regulatory functions transferred to the Maritime and Port Authority of Singapore on 2 February 1996
PSA International, corporatisation of port services on 1 October 1997
Singapore Power, corporatisation of electricity and gas services on 1 October 1995

See also
 Singapore Civil Service
 Public Service Commission
 Organisation of the Government of Singapore

References

External links 
Singapore Government Website
Singapore Government Ministries
Singapore Government Statboards